Sergei Alexandrovich Aksenov (born April 3, 1971) is a Russian political dissident, publicist, former prisoner, member of National Bolshevik Party since 1997, cofounder of coalition The Other Russia and one of the leaders of the political party The Other Russia.

Biography
Sergei Aksenov was born in Vladimir. He has studied in Moscow State University of Economics. In 1997 Aksenov was member of National Bolshevik Party. Aksenov was jailed in April, 2001 on charges of terrorism, the forced overthrow of the constitutional order, and the illegal purchase of weapons. Since 2004 Aksenov is member of the Central Committee of the National Bolshevik Party. In 2008 Aksenov was one of the organizers of the Dissenters' March. In 2009 Aksenov was one of the organizers of the Strategy-31. In 2010 Aksenov was cofounder of political party The Other Russia.

References

External links
The Other Russia - Sergei Aksenov's biography
Official blog of Sergei Aksenov

Living people
1971 births
National Bolshevik Party politicians
Prisoners and detainees of Russia
Russian dissidents
Russian nationalists
Moscow State University of Economics, Statistics, and Informatics alumni